The Ust-Vilyuy Range is a range of mountains in North-eastern Russia. Administratively the range is part of the Sakha Republic of the Russian Federation. The area of the range is largely uninhabited, there are only some abandoned villages.

Geography
The Ust-Vilyuy Range is a subrange of the Verkhoyansk Range, part of the East Siberian System of mountains. It rises in the southwestern side of the Verkhoyansk Range, above the eastern bank of the Lena River, opposite the mouth of the Vilyuy River in the Lena's western bank, at the edge of the Central Yakutian Lowland. The highest point of the range is an unnamed peak reaching .

The range runs parallel to the Kuturgin Range, a higher mountain chain that rises to the northeast, beyond which stretches the Bygyn Range. The northwestern end of the Chochum Range, which extends further southeastwards, rises off the eastern end of the Ust-Vilyuy Range. River Lyapiske, a tributary of the Lena, flows into its right bank at the northwestern limit of the range.

Flora and fauna
The slopes of the mountains are smooth and are covered with larch taiga. Among the animals found in the region are elk, sable, muskrat, wild reindeer, brown bear, wolverine, black grouse, Western capercaillie, white-tailed eagle, hazel grouse, snow sheep, golden eagle, peregrine falcon, black-capped marmot, brent goose and whooper swan.  of the range are a protected area, the Ust-Vilyui Natural Park.

See also
Kharaulakh Range

References

External links

Verkhoyansk Range

ceb:Khrebet Ust'-Vilyuyskiy